The 1923–24 Harvard Crimson men's ice hockey season was the 26th season of play for the program.

Season
Though he is credited with coaching the 1923–24 team, William Henry Claflin Jr. left Harvard after 1923 and was replaced by his predecessor for one season. Alfred Winsor faced a tough task in trying to implement his defensive structure with college hockey now playing a 6-on-6 format rather than the 7-on-7 that saw him win seven Intercollegiate Championships. After early season success, the team faced a tough challenge from visiting Canadian colleges and lost all three matches, though the defense did perform well. After winning their next three intercollegiate games Harvard had hopes of winning another championship, but their campaign took a hit when they were stymied by Yale in early February.

Harvard still had a chance for the championship if they could win the season series against the Elis, but they would have to get by three other clubs before the rematch. After winning the season series over Princeton, Harvard had to face down Dartmouth and lost to the Indians for the second year in a row. No longer in the running for the Intercollegiate Championship, Harvard could still manage a league title if they could defeat Yale but the Elis had other ideas and downed the Crimson 6–1.

Roster

Standings

Schedule and results

|-
!colspan=12 style=";" | Regular Season

References

Harvard Crimson men's ice hockey seasons
Harvard
Harvard
Harvard
Harvard
Harvard